Abductor may refer to:

 Abductor, someone performing a kidnapping (abduction)
 Abductor muscle, a muscle which draws a limb away from the median plane of the body
 Abductor wedge, a medical device that separates the legs of a patient
 The Abductors, a 1957 film directed by Andrew McLaglen

See also
 Abduction (disambiguation)